Pez (stylised as PEZ) is the brand name of an Austrian candy and associated manual candy dispensers. The candy is a pressed, dry, straight-edged, curved-corner block 15 mm ( inch) long, 8 mm ( inch) wide and 5 mm ( inch) high, with each Pez dispenser holding 12 candy pieces.

Pez was invented in Austria and later exported worldwide. The all-uppercase spelling of the logo echoes the trademark's style on the packaging and the dispensers, with the logo drawn in perspective and giving the appearance that the letters are built out of 44 brick-like Pez mints (14 bricks in the P and 15 in each of the E and Z).

Despite the widespread recognition and popularity of the Pez dispenser, the company considers itself to be primarily a candy company, and "[t]oday, billions of PEZ candies are consumed annually in the U.S.A. alone". Pez dispensers are a part of popular culture in many nations, an example being "Soul Candy" in the Japanese manga series Bleach. Because of the large number of dispenser designs over the years, they are collected by many.

History
PEZ was first marketed as a compressed peppermint sweet in Vienna, Austria, in 1927 by Eduard Haas III. The original product was a round peppermint lozenge called PEZ drops. Over time, a new manufacturing process evolved and the hard pressed brick shape known today was created. The product packaging evolved from wrapped rolls to a small tin to hold the mints, similar to the modern Altoids tins. The first PEZ mint dispensers, known as "regulars", were similar in shape to a cigarette lighter and dispensed an adult breath mint marketed as an alternative to tobacco. They were invented by Oscar Uxa. Haas Food Manufacturing Corporation of Vienna was the first to sell PEZ products.

World War II slowed marketing and production. In 1945, manufacturers devised and promoted the Pez Box Regular. In 1949 the first dispenser is officially introduced at the Vienna Trade Fair. In 1952 Eduard Haas introduced his product to the United States, and Curtis Allina headed Pez's U.S. business. In 1955, the Pez company placed heads on the dispensers and marketed them for children. Santa Claus, Popeye, Mickey Mouse and Donald Duck were among the first character dispensers. Since 1950, over 1500 Pez dispensers, including the original character dispensers, have been created.

Pez vending machines were used in Germany, Switzerland and Austria. The first German machines were introduced around 1954 and were produced by DWM and GWS, both of Berlin, Germany. Machines were later introduced in Switzerland and then in Austria, in October 1956; these were produced by Glerios / R.Seipel & Co. and Theodor Braun (Vienna).

In 1973, Pez built a factory in Orange, Connecticut, U.S. In 1983, Scott McWhinnie became the president of the Pez company. He retired in 2003. Joe Vittoria became president of the company in 2004. Around 2005 the size of the original factory was doubled and the Pez dispenser line was expanded. In the mid-1990s peppermints were reintroduced with remakes of the "regulars".

In early 2002 the family of the original founder of the company bought back 32.5% of the stock from investment company PGH for €18M. They now own 67.5% of the company. The headquarters are in Traun, Austria. The Pez mints are produced in Traun and Orange, Connecticut, U.S. while the dispensers are produced in Hungary and China. In 2011, a PEZ Visitor Center was opened in Orange, CT with over 4,000 square feet dedicated to all things PEZ.

Patents
Pez, Inc. has applied for and received patents related to the Pez dispensers, and usually molds the patent number onto the stem of the design. The patent number cannot be reliably used to determine how old the dispenser is. Collectors refer to the first two digits of a patent number as a shorthand for a given patent number. For example, the 5.9 (5,984,285) patent was granted in 1999, but did not first appear on a Pez item until 2002. By 2007, 4.9 patented items were still regularly appearing on store shelves. Dispensers can also be found with several non-US patents, such as the German "DBP 818.829" (Deutsches Bundes-Patent) and the Mexican "Patent Nr 141,242".

Injection mold codes
Pez dispenser stems will usually also be embossed with several injection mold codes (IMCs). Some, like those found on the bottom of the dispenser feet, will tell which mold position the specific piece came from. One found on the side of the stem indicates the country of origin.

The IMC code 4 is followed by a superscripted second number which identifies the specific facility in Austria.

Characters

Early Pez dispensers did not have character heads on them. They were what is known now as "regulars". A regular dispenser is just a rectangular box with a contoured flip top for dispensing the candy. Toy character head dispensers were introduced in 1955, after the candy was introduced in the United States. There are over 550 unique dispenser heads with thousands of variations.

In the 1970s, three historical figures were created: Betsy Ross, Daniel Boone, and Paul Revere, which were released as part of the Bicentennial series. These dispenser heads were not made to actually look like the people they represented, but instead used generic faces with different accessories.

Star Wars Pez dispensers have been amongst the most popular collectibles since they were introduced in the 1990s.

The company initially had a general rule against creating likenesses of real people, but in 2006 a limited-edition series of three Pez dispensers were made with likenesses of members of the Teutul family from Orange County Choppers.

The NASCAR-themed dispensers are based on the helmets of famous drivers, rather than their actual resemblance.

In 2007, a limited edition Elvis set was released featuring three dispensers from different periods in Presley's life.

In 2008, the first Star Trek dispensers were released in a gift set with the seven original series crew and the Starship Enterprise. A second Star Trek gift set, based on The Next Generation series, was released in autumn 2012.

In 2009, in honour of the 70th anniversary of The Wizard of Oz, Pez released a boxed set with dispensers in the likenesses of the Cowardly Lion, the Tin Man, the Scarecrow, Dorothy Gale, Toto, Glinda, the Wizard of Oz and the Wicked Witch of the West. Only 300,000 sets were made.

In 2010, Pez released a Snow White and the Seven Dwarfs set, featuring a story book. These are the first characters featured on the "Short Stem" body. Only 250,000 sets were made.

In 2011, a two-piece limited edition set was released for charity featuring Prince William and his wife-to-be, Kate Middleton.

In 2011, an eight-piece limited edition set was released featuring characters from The Lord of the Rings as they appear in Peter Jackson's The Lord of the Rings films: Bilbo, Frodo, Sam, Gandalf, Aragorn, Legolas, Gimli and Gollum. Only 250,000 sets were made. 150,000 Walmart-exclusive sets were made. The Walmart sets did not have Bilbo. Instead, they came with the Eye of Sauron.

In October 2012, Pez released a limited edition KISS gift set. The Starchild, The Demon, The Catman and The Spaceman are displayed in a reusable metal gift tin.

In 2013, Pez released the Monsters University pez. The characters were Mike Wazowski, James P. "Sulley" Sullivan, Scott "Squishy" Squibbles and Randall Boggs.

In September 2013, Pez released the Hobbit gift set. Bilbo Baggins, Gandalf the Grey, Thorin Oakenshield, Fimbul the Hunter, Radagast, Kili, Bofur and Dwalin are displayed in a printed cardboard box.

In 2013, Pez released a series of 18 wheeler trucks. There were companies like Walgreens, Nice, Wawa, Safeway, Randall's, up market, Havoline and many more.

In 2014, Pez released a giant Raphael from Teenage Mutant Ninja Turtles.

In 2014, Pez released an Angry Birds gift tin. It had Red, Bomb, Stella, and a Minion Pig in a reusable metal gift tin.

List of Pez sets of popular characters

Fandom

Value of Pez dispensers
Some Pez dispensers can sell for large amounts as collectibles. The highest verifiable sale of a Pez dispenser was a private sale of a Mickey Mouse softhead at $7,000 between an Austrian dealer and a US collector. This dispenser was never available for sale to the public, and was a factory prototype. The most valuable Pez dispensers are three Political Donkeys, each valued at over $13,000, one of which was owned by John F. Kennedy.

Pez conventions and gatherings
The Pez collecting hobby has grown to the point where several conventions are held annually around the world. The oldest convention is Pez-a-Mania, which has been held in Cleveland, Ohio since 1991.

Film adaptation
Envision Media Arts are developing an animated film version of Pez with Cameron Fay writing a screenplay, Lee Nelson and David Buelow producing, and Gregg Rossen, Brian Sawyer and Jonathan Hung executive producing the film.

Card game
The Pez Card Game is an out-of-print multiplayer collectible card game based on Pez candy. The object of the game is to earn 25 points through playing cards with Pez flavours and dispensers. The core set contained 204 cards.

See also
 Burlingame Museum of Pez Memorabilia
 Pez Card Game

Bibliography

References

Further reading

External links
 
 

 
Food and drink companies of Austria
Products introduced in 1927
Companies based in Vienna
Companies based in New Haven County, Connecticut
Brand name confectionery
Austrian inventions
Austrian brands
Austrian companies established in 1927
Food and drink companies established in 1927